Brandywine Creek State Park is a state park, located  north of Wilmington, Delaware along the Brandywine Creek. It contains the first two nature preserves in Delaware. These nature preserves are Tulip Tree Woods and Freshwater Marsh. Flint Woods is a satellite area of the park and has become the park's third nature preserve. Flint Woods is home to species of rare song birds and an old-growth forest. The park's forests are part of the Northeastern coastal forests ecoregion.

Fourteen miles of trails run through the park, the longest being the Rocky Run Trail and the Greenway Trail. Brandywine Creek has a large population of bass, and Wilson's Run is known for its trout. Nearby parks include White Clay Creek State Park, Wilmington State Parks, and Bellevue State Park.

History
Much of Brandywine Creek State Park was originally a portion of the du Pont family's Winterthur estate. In the mid-1800s, the du Ponts hired Italian masons to build stone walls around much of the property that is today part of the park. In 1893, Henry A. du Pont acquired the herd of dairy cattle that he housed on what would eventually become the park.

Henry Francis du Pont inherited the estate in 1927. He was much less interested in maintaining a working farm than his father and grandfather, and instead had an eye toward transforming the estate into a museum of American arts. Wheelwright was a prominent landscape architect who had in 1924 founded the University of Pennsylvania's landscape architecture school. The Wheelwrights maintained the estate until Robert's death in 1965.

With plans in motion to transform the rural scenic estate into housing developments, local citizens convinced the state that it should preserve the land.

The park was brought up to its present size in 1981, when an additional  were donated to the state by William Poole Bancroft's Woodlawn Trustees. Bancroft, a nationally recognized land conservationist with a deep appreciation for the beauty of the Brandywine, had become concerned about the expansion of nearby Wilmington and purchased a considerable amount of land in the Brandywine region with the intention of preserving it as open space parkland for future generations. He had also established the Trustees to continue acquiring land around the Brandywine after his death to be managed as parkland.

Brandywine Creek Nature Center
The park's Brandywine Creek Nature Center offers natural history and environmental education programs for visitors, school and scout groups, and other organizations. Programs include nature crafts and lectures, hayrides, guided nature walks, children's programs, and birding programs.

References

External links
 Brandywine Creek State Park
 Friends of Brandywine Creek State Park

State parks of Delaware
Nature centers in Delaware
Protected areas established in 1965
Parks in New Castle County, Delaware
1965 establishments in Delaware